The 1980 NSL Cup was the fourth season of the NSL Cup, which was the main national association football knockout cup competition in Australia. All 14 NSL teams from around Australia entered the competition, as well as a further 18 from various state leagues around Australia.

Bracket

First round

Round of 16

Quarter-finals

Semi-finals

Final

Replay

References

NSL Cup
1980 in Australian soccer
NSL Cup seasons